was a Japanese film actor from Chōshi, Chiba. Okada served in the Imperial Japanese Army during World War II and was a miner and traveling salesman before becoming an actor.

Internationally, his best-remembered roles include Lui ("him" in French) in the 1959 film Hiroshima mon amour, directed by Alain Resnais. In this film, Eiji Okada had to learn the screenplay phonetically because he didn't speak French. He is also known for playing the entomologist Niki Junpei in Hiroshi Teshigahara's 1964 film Woman in the Dunes, an adaptation of Kōbō Abe's novel. He was also second billed under Marlon Brando in the 1963 political thriller The Ugly American.

Okada was married to Aiko Wasa, with whom he ran a theatre company in Japan. He died on 14 September 1995 of heart failure, at the age of 75.

Selected filmography

 Onna no Kao (1949)
 Hana no Sugao (1949)
 Until We Meet Again (1950) – Tajima Saburo
 Shiroi yajû (1950) – Iwasaki
 Gozen reiji no shutugoku (1950)
 Kenjū no Mae ni Tatsu Haha (1950)
 Nakinureta ningyô (1951) – Ryûji
 Fūsetsu Nijūnen (1951)
 Kaze ni soyogu asi (Kouhen) (1951) – Mitsujiro Hirose
 Yamabiko Gakkō (1952)
 Asa no hamon (1952) – Kajigoro
 Mother (1952) – Shinjiro
 Boryoku (1952)
 Shinkū Chitai (1952) – Okamoto
 Haha wo Kou  Uta (1952) 
 Reimei hachigatsu jugo-nichi (1952)
 Himeyuri no Tō (1953) – Teacher Tamai
 Hiroshima (1953) – Kitagawa
 Miseraretaru Tamashii (1953)
 Wakaki Hi no Takuboku Kumo wa Tensai De Aru (1954) – Takuboku Ishikawa
 Okuman choja (1954) – Monta
 Hana to Hatō (1954)
 Ningen Gyorai Kaiten (1955)
 Koko ni Izumi Ari (1955)
 Hana no Yukue (1955) – Hiroshi Hamamura
 Gokumonchô (1955) – San'nosuke Tsuzuki
 Christ in Bronze (1955)
 Bōryokugai (1955)
 Kao no nai otoko (1955) – Masahiko Arisaka / Yamada
 Kenjû tai kenjû (1955)
 Choppu sensei (1956)
 Shonen tanteidan: Nijumenso no akuma (1956) – Kogoro Akechi
 Shonen tanteidan: Daiichibu yokaihakushi (1956)
 Kurama Tengu, Shirouma no Misshi (1956)
 Jun'ai Monogatari (1957) – Shitayama
 Dotanba (1957)
 Shonen tanteidan: Tetto no kaijin (1957) – Kogoro Akechi
 Shonen tanteidan: Kabutomushi no yoki (1957)
 Shingo juban-shobu (1959) – Shozaburo Masaki
 Hiroshima mon amour (1959) – Lui
 Shingo jûban shôbu: dai-ni-bu (1959)
 Shinran (1960) – Shiro Amagi
 Ôzora no muhômono (1960)
 Kaizoku bahansen (1960)
 Restoration Fire (1961) – Yamanami Keisuke
 Kengo tengu matsuri (1961)
 Rififi in Tokyo (1963) – Danny Riquet
 The Ugly American (1963) – Deong
 Kanojo to kare (1963) – Eiichi Ishikawa
 Woman in the Dunes (1964) – Entomologist Niki Jumpei
 The Scent of Incense (Kôge - Nibu: Mitsumata no shô/Ichibu: Waremokô no shô) (1964) – Nozawa
 Ansatsu (1964) – Lord Matsudaira
 The Scarlet Camellia (1964) – Genjirô Maruume
 Haigo no hito (1965) – Masaaki Izumida
 Sanshiro Sugata (1965) – Gennosuke / Tesshin
 Samurai Spy (1965) – Tatewaki Koriyama
 Nihon daikyôkaku (1966) – Shuji Onoda
 Hikô shôjo Yôko (1966) – Asai
 The Face of Another (1966) – The Boss
 Bosû wa ore no kenjû de (1966)
 The X from Outer Space (1967) – Dr. Kato
 Portrait of Chieko (1967) – Tsubaki
 Utage (1967) – Adachi
 The Sands of Kurobe (1968) – Yoshino
 Irezumi muzan (1968)
 Shin irezumi muzan tekka no jingi (1968)
 Showa no inochi (1968)
 Tarekomi (1969) – Toru Kijima
 Dankon (1969) – George Kitabayashi
 Nyotai (1969) – Nobuyuki Ishidô
 Jotai (1969) – Nobuyuki Ishido
 Mujo (1970)
 Senketsu no kiroku (1970)
 Yomigaeru daichi (1971) – Mitsuo iwashita
 Yami no naka no chimimoryo (1971) – Ikezoe
 Silence (1971) – Inoue Chikugonokami
 Tsuji-ga-hana (1972)
 Bara no hyôteki (1972) -Tachibana Mike
 Zatoichi's Conspiracy (1973) – Shinbei of Hitachiya
 Lone Wolf and Cub: Baby Cart in the Land of Demons (1973) – Wakita
 Lady Snowblood (1973) – Gishirô Tsukamoto
 Waga michi (1974) – Lawyer
 Mesu (1974) – Kokubo
 The Yakuza (1974) – Tono
 ESPY (1974) – Salabad
 I am a cat (1975) – Bunmei
 Kimi yo Fundo no Kawa o Watare (1976)
 Lullaby of the Earth (1976) – Evangelist
 Utareru mae-ni ute! (1976) – President Kudo
 Permanent Blue: Manatsu no koi (1976) – Boy's father
 Arasuka monogatari (1977) – Amaohka
 Seishun no mon: Jiritsu hen (1977) – Minoru Yuki
 Utamaro: Yume to shiriseba (1977) – Tanuma
 Wakai hito (1977) – Mr. Okajima
 Nihon no jingi (1977) – Yohei Inada
 Genshiryoku sensô (1978) – Professor Kamiyama
 Ogin-sama (1978) – Ankokuji
 Furimukeba Ai (1978) – Ryunosuke Tamaru
 Kôtei no inai hachigatsu (1978) – Tokunaga
 Blue Christmas (1978)
 Ôgon no inu (1979) – Shuhei Agata
 Kôsatsu (1979) – Yoshio Morikawa
 Jishin rettô (1980)
 Kofukugo shuppan (1980)
 The Gate of Youth (1981) – Tôno, Chika's step father
 Crazy Fruit (1981) – Yuzo Dojima
 Nankyoku Monogatari (1983) – Chief Ozawa
 Akujo kamakiri (1983) – Taichi Dôjima
 Haru no kane (1985) – Hachiro Ishimoto
 Ôidippsu no katana (1986) – Shunsuke's uncle
 Oedipus no yaiba (1986) – Shunsuke's uncle
 Guriin rekuiemu (1988) – Zenichiro Okada
 Shishiohtachi no natsu (1991) – Kazumichi Sakagami
 Kagerô (1991) – Masakichi Ono
 Jutai (1991) – Ichimatsu, Grandfather
 Harukana jidai no kaidan o (1995) – White man
 Hitodenashi no koi (1995) – (final film role)

References

External links

1920 births
1995 deaths
20th-century Japanese male actors
Japanese male film actors
People from Chōshi
Actors from Chiba Prefecture
Imperial Japanese Army personnel of World War II